Lalit Nagar is former member of the Haryana Legislative Assembly from the Indian National Congress representing the Tigaon Vidhan Sabha constituency in Haryana.

References 

Year of birth missing (living people)
Living people
Members of the Haryana Legislative Assembly
Indian National Congress politicians from Haryana
People from Faridabad